Shriyanka Sadangi (born 1995) is an Indian shooter and has represented her state and India at national and international level.

Early life 
Sadangi was born in 1995 in Sambalpur to Sudha Sadangi and Sitansu Sadangi. Her father's Indian army service took her to many cities in India while growing up.

Education 
Sadangi finished her schooling at the Delhi Public School, Vasant Kunj. She trains and practices at the Gagan Narang Academy, Pune. She also received a scholarship from the Oil and Natural Gas Corporation Limited.
She joined the MBA program at KIIT School of Management, KIIT deemed to be University in July 2018 and is currently studying there.

Sports career 
In 2010, Sadangi participated in the World Shooting Championship in Germany.

In October 2011 in the Asian Airgun Championship organised in Kuwait, Sadangi bagged a gold medal. In November of the same year, she won a silver and two bronze medals in individual events at the 55th National Shooting championship.

In January 2012, Sadangi bagged a silver medal in 10 meter Air Rifle Women category in the 12th Asian Championship held at Doha. She scored 394 out of 400 at the championship in Doha.That achievement made her the most successful shooter from the Indian state of Odisha.

Sadangi's first achievement in senior category the same year was a silver medal in the 5th Asian Senior Airgun Shooting Championship in Nanchang, China. This was a 10-metre Air Rifle event.

In 2014, Sadangi was selected in the Indian team for the 51st ISSF World Shooting Championship at Granada, Spain.

In 2015, Sadangi won a silver in Asian Shooting Championship in 10m Air Rifle Junior Women's event at Kuwait.

In 2016, she won a silver in 9th Asian Airgun Championship, 10 meter Air Rifle Shooting event in Tehran, Iran. This was the fifth position in the championship.

In 2018, Shriyanka lost the shootoff for gold in women's air rifle, after a close match with Charleen Baenisch of Germany in the International shooting championship.

Awards 
Sadangi has bagged 3 gold medals, 6 silver medals, and 3 bronze medals in various international events. This is in addition to many national medals.

In 2014, she was recognized with the Ekalabya Puraskar which is the most prestigious sports award of Odisha.

References 

Living people
1995 births
Indian female sport shooters